Narcissus alcaracensis is a species of bulbous plant that is endemic to Spain.  Its natural habitats are rivers and swamps. It is threatened by habitat loss. The World Checklist of Selected Plant Families does not accept the name N. alcaracensis, regarding it as a synonym of the widespread N. hispanicus.

Narcissus alcaracensis has a very narrow range, found only in the Alcaraz mountains in Spain. It grows in marshes along with Carex hispida, in streams and shallow lakes. Agriculture continues to threaten the species, with the only surviving populations in nature reserves.

References

alcaracensis
Endemic flora of Spain
Endangered plants
Plants described in 1999
Taxonomy articles created by Polbot